Shuchi Chawla is an Indian computer scientist who works in the design and analysis of algorithms, and is known for her research on correlation clustering, information privacy, mechanism design, approximation algorithms, hardness of approximation, and algorithmic bias. She works as a professor of computer science at the University of Texas at Austin.

Education and career
Chawla earned a bachelor's degree from the Indian Institute of Technology Delhi in 2000, and received her Ph.D. from Carnegie Mellon University in 2005. Her dissertation, Graph Algorithms for Planning and Partitioning, was supervised by Avrim Blum. After postdoctoral studies at Stanford University under the mentorship of Tim Roughgarden, and at Microsoft Research, Silicon Valley, she joined the Wisconsin faculty in 2006.. She joined the UT-Austin faculty in 2021.
She won a Sloan Research Fellowship in 2009, and was named a Kavli Fellow in 2012.

Selected publications

References

External links
 Home page
 

American computer scientists
American women computer scientists
Computer systems researchers
Living people
Carnegie Mellon University alumni
IIT Delhi alumni
University of Wisconsin–Madison faculty
Sloan Research Fellows
Year of birth missing (living people)
Theoretical computer scientists